The 2019 Horizon League baseball tournament was held from May 22 through 25.  All six of the league's teams met in the double-elimination tournament held at the home field of the regular season champion.  The winner of the tournament, UIC, earned the conference's automatic bid to the 2019 NCAA Division I baseball tournament.

Seeding and format
The league's teams were seeded one through six based on winning percentage, using conference games only.  The bottom four seeds participated in a play-in round, with winners advancing to a double-elimination tournament also including the top two seeds.

Bracket

Play-In Round

Double-Elimination Rounds

Conference championship

References

Tournament
Horizon League Baseball Tournament
Horizon League baseball tournament
Horizon League baseball tournament
College sports tournaments in Ohio
Fairborn, Ohio
Baseball competitions in Ohio